The R752 road is a regional road in County Wicklow, Ireland. From its junction with the R772 in Rathnew on the outskirts of Wicklow Town it takes a generally south-westerly route to its junction with the R747 in the village of Woodenbridge, where it terminates.

En route it passes through Glenealy, Rathdrum, The Meeting of the Waters and Avoca. It closely follows the route of the Dublin – Wexford - Rosslare Europort railway line and at one stage it was part the main road from Dublin to Wexford, then called the T34.

See also
Roads in Ireland
National primary road
National secondary road

References
Roads Act 1993 (Classification of Regional Roads) Order 2006 – Department of Transport

Regional roads in the Republic of Ireland
Roads in County Wicklow